Journeys by DJ originated as a UK dance music record label, which started as a series of DJ mix albums or mixtapes on the Music Unites label in 1992, and moved from London to New York City in 2000. Journeys by DJ was the first record label to focus exclusively on the art and format of the DJ mix, as opposed to singles, 12" singles, artist albums and compilations. As acclaimed in the authoritative Last Night a DJ Saved My Life: The Story of the Disc Jockey, Journeys by DJ (JDJ) was the first label to release full-length mixes of live DJ sets on CD. Other labels since the 70s released recordings of DJs spinning live, along with DJ-friendly vinyl "megamixes", and the 80s saw innumerable illegal mix tapes flood the market, but Journeys by DJ was the first label to set its stall out on the proposition that dance music is best heard in the mix, with high production values, and that the DJ can transcend the role of human jukebox to become a narrative artist and guide into the unknown.

Journeys By DJ Releases

Journeys by DJ Special Releases

Journeys By DJ International Releases

Journeys By DJ Promotional Releases

Journeys by DJ Artwork

Notable releases

Journeys By DJ: Coldcut - 70 Minutes of Madness 

Originally released in 1995, Journeys by DJ: Coldcut - 70 Minutes of Madness was a release on the Music Unites/Sony record label.

Track listing 
 1a. Philorene - "Bola"
 1b. Depth Charge - "Depth Charge"
 2. Truper, The - "Street Beats Vol. 2"
 3. Junior Reid - "One Blood"
 4. Newcleus - "Jam On Revenge (The Wikki Wikki Song)"
 5. 2 Player - "Extreme Possibilities (Wagon Christ Remix)"
 6. Funki Porcini - "King Ashabanapal (Dillinja Mix)"
 7. Jedi Knights - "Noddy Holder"
 8. Plastikman - "Fuk" 
 9. Coldcut - "More Beats" 
 10. Bedouin Ascent - "Manganese in Deep Violet" 
 11. Bob Holroyd - "African Drug" 
 12. Air Liquide - "Stratus Static" 
 13. Coldcut - "Beats and Pieces" 
 14. Coldcut - "That Greedy Beat"
 15. Matt Black & The Coldcut Crew - "The Music Maker"
 16. Coldcut - "Find a Way (Acapella)"
 17. Mantronix - "King of the Beats"
 18. Gescom - "Mag"
 19. Masters At Work - "Justa 'Lil' Dope"
 20. Raphael Corderdos - "Parp 1 / Rock Creak Parp"
 21. Luke Slater's 7th Plain - "Grace"
 22. Joanna Law - "First Time Ever I Saw Your Face (Acapella)"
 23. Harold Budd - "Balthus Bemused by Color" 
 24. Photek - "Into the 90's" 
 25. BDP - "The Bridge Is Over" 
 26. DJ Food - "Dark Blood (MLO Nu Blud Mix)"  
 27. Jhelisa - "Friendly Pressure (Acapella)" 
 28. Hookian Mindz - "Freshmess (Bandulu Mix)" 
 29. Jello Biafra - "Message from Our Sponsor" 
 30. Pressure Drop - "Unify" 
 31. Love Lee - "Again Son" 
 32. Red Snapper - "Hot Flush (Sabres Of Paradise Remix)"
 33. Ron Grainer - "Theme from Dr Who"
 34. Moody Boys - "Free" 
 35. DJ Food - "The Dusk"

References

1996 compilation albums
DJ mix album series
Dub albums
Techno compilation albums
Drum and bass albums
Hip hop compilation albums